This is an example of a family tree of the Māori gods showing the most important gods in Māori mythology.

This family tree gives just an example - there are remarkable regional variations.

Māori Goddesses are displayed in italics

The primordial gods were Ranginui and Papatūānuku, Heaven and Earth.

Te Anu-matao was the wife of Tangaroa.

Hine-titamauri was the wife of Punga.

Hine-te-Iwaiwa married Tangaroa and had Tangaroa-a-kiukiu, Tangaroa-a-roto, and Rona.
Tangaroa-a-roto and Rona married Te Marama the moon. Hinetakurua married Tama-nui-te-ra, the Sun.

Uru-Te-ngangana is believed to be the father of all light, and his children are stars, sun and moon.

The father and mother of creation/all gods are personifications of the stages of creation; Te Kore, Te Po, etc

See also
 Māori mythology
 List of Māori deities

References

Māori mythology
Maori gods
Māori deities

ru:Мифология маори#Боги